Dragons' Den is a British reality television business programme, presented by Evan Davis and based upon the original Japanese series. The show allows several entrepreneurs an opportunity to present their varying business ideas to a panel of five wealthy investors, the "Dragons" of the show's title, and pitch for financial investment while offering a stake of the company in return.

The first episode was broadcast on BBC Two on 4 January 2005. After 16 series on the channel, the show has been broadcast on BBC One since 2021. Reruns of previous episodes are still broadcast on BBC Two. The programme is produced by BBC Studios Factual Entertainment Productions and co-produced with Sony Pictures Television International, the owners of the format that is distributed worldwide.

Programme

Format
Contestants have what they believe to be a viable and potentially profitable business idea but lack funding, or are already operating their business, but need additional funds for promotion or expansion. As part of their opening pitch, they are required to specify the amount of money they require from the Dragons (referred to as such because of their often suspicious, harsh questioning of contestants as well as their having the wealth the contestants seek, similar to legends of dragons guarding gold). The rules stipulate that if they do not raise at least this amount from one or more Dragons, then they would leave with nothing. In exchange for the investment, the contestants offer equity in their business, the percentage of which is also stipulated at the beginning of the pitch. If the Dragons see potential in the business idea or product, negotiations then take place around the amount of equity on offer, with the contestant having the opportunity to negotiate further, accept any offers, or simply walk away. Dragons can also offer a percentage of the money requested if they do not wish to commit the full amount, leaving the other Dragons free to do the same. This can lead to the contestant receiving the financial backing of more than one Dragon, with the benefit of a broader range of expertise. However, for this to occur, the contestant usually has to agree to relinquish a larger share in their business than they had first planned.

A Dragon who, having heard the pitch, does not wish to invest, must declare themselves "out", implying that they leave the discussion. (However, on one occasion in series 4, Peter Jones continued to question an entrepreneur after his own declaration.) This concluding phase may range from a few minutes if the Dragons do not perceive the business plan as credible, to much longer when complex conditions are negotiated. The Dragons often ridicule contestants, on grounds that vary widely, but especially for over-valuation of their respective enterprises.

There is no legal commitment for the Dragons or producers of the show to fulfil their offers. All deals undergo due diligence before contracts are signed. It is claimed that half of deals are not completed after filming.

Set and theme
The opening sequence was shot in Ancoats, Manchester, an area transformed by the Industrial Revolution which helped give the city its nickname Cottonopolis. The sequence features shots of Brunswick Mill, Murrays' Mills and McConnel & Kennedy mills – all three are Manchester's most famous cotton mills from the time of the Industrial Revolution, and their use maintains the programme's warehouse theme. The location at which the pitches are filmed has varied over the years. It was originally filmed inside a furniture depository in Stoke Newington. The production was forced to move after the first series owing to building work next door. For the second series shooting took place in a disused warehouse, Wool House. It was the first set created by production designer Laurence Williams, requiring the construction of a section of the window wall and the staircase down to the lower floor. The owner of this warehouse converted it into flats, necessitating a further move to Tanner Street for the next few series. Here another more extensive set was created, including cutting a hole in the floor and again creating the stairs down to the lower floor. Building work necessitated another move, this time to Pinewood Studios, only two weeks before a series was due to be shot; the production designer had to create a complete set on the film stage, including a staircase which descended down into the underfloor tank. After several more series were shot at Pinewood, the production was moved to the BBC's new home in Salford Quays at dock10, MediaCityUK. A brand new set was created for the move, and was screened in the latter part of 2012 for Series 10.

Space Studios Manchester, in Gorton, was also used to film the programme from 2015 to 2017. From 2018 onward the show has been filmed at Old Granada Studios in Manchester. In October 2021, the BBC announced that it was to relocate programme production from Manchester to Glasgow.

Awards

The Dragons

Notes
There have always been five dragons, with the exception of an episode that first aired on 28 October 2012 (Series 10), when there were only four, as Hilary Devey was unwell. This was the first time in the show's history that this has occurred.
Steve Parish was originally going to replace Nick Jenkins, but found he did not have the time and stepped down. He was instead replaced by Tej Lalvani.
Steven Bartlett is the youngest dragon to join the den, as of 2021, at just 28. He has teased that he does not intend to wear a suit, as most male dragons traditionally do, during his time on the show.
Series 18 marked the first temporary absence of Peter Jones, as he self isolated due to the COVID-19 pandemic. Theo Paphitis returned to cover his absence for 3 episodes.

Statistics

Successful deals per dragon per series

Statistics of successful deals per dragon
As of the end of Season 19

General Statistics
as of 2014 confirm:

 £100,000 is the most common investment figure asked for by pitchers (30 of 143 pitches)
 £35,000 is the lowest ever amount offered for a successful pitch.
 £250,000 is the highest amount ever successfully pitched for in the den.
 The highest amount of equity ever given away in the den was 79% by RKA Records, which has later renamed Bannatyne Music Ltd.
 The most common amount of equity given away in successful pitches was 40%, with 42 of 143 pitches giving up that share in their company.
 Deborah Meaden currently holds the record for the highest number of successful business deals overall with 84 and counting.
 Tej Lalvani currently holds the record for the highest number of successful business deals in a single series with 12.
 Peter Jones is the most prolific investor, offering investment to 54 of the 143 businesses who successfully pitched on the show.

Pitches

Ratings 
Episode ratings from BARB.

Series 1

Series 2

Series 3

Series 4

Series 5

Series 6

Series 7

Series 8

Series 9

Series 10

Series 11

Series 12

Series 13

Series 14

Series 15

Series 16

Series 17

Series 18

Series 19

Series 20

Special episodes

Where Are They Now?
Where Are They Now? is a companion series to the main programme, often broadcast after each respective series, taking a look back at some of the show's success stories – and biggest failures – and finding out what the participants are up to six months on. The series began with a one-off two part special, broadcast on 21 and 28 December 2005, in which presenter Evan Davis reviewed the programme's success stories from series one and two, and looked at the entrepreneurs who received funds to market their ideas. Cameras followed Charles Ejogo, who planned to put umbrella vending machines in London Underground stations, jewellery designer Elizabeth Galton, magazine publisher Huw Gwyther and Rachel Lowe, whose London-based board game caught their eye. Following this, another one-off two part special was broadcast on 28 September – 8 October 2006. Later, two full series of the show were commissioned, with series one, of four episodes, being broadcast between 18 July and 2 August 2007.

Series two, of five episodes, each following a respective Dragon and their investments, was broadcast between 17 September and 24 October 2010. Peter Jones' episode followed him meeting with Kirsty Henshaw, who made an emotional pitch in the Den when she came in with her frozen dessert business, and was determined to get her product on the supermarket shelves as soon as possible, and also meeting up with condiment king Levi Roots. Duncan Bannatyne's episode followed him as he travelled to the south of France to oversee his daughter's wedding, and then went back to work to follow up on some of his investments. Theo Paphitis' episode followed him as he took 90 employees to Greece for a week of team-building exercises, and also visited two companies he invested in to see how they were getting on. Series five, episode nine also featured at a look back at deals from the series, in a similar vein to Where Are They Now?.

Outside the Den
Outside the Den takes a step back from the world of Dragons' Den, to take a personal look at the Dragons themselves, including personal and intimate interviews, a look behind their business credentials, and taking the cameras into their personal lives. Six episodes of the series have been produced – with the first set of five episodes airing between 27 October and 23 November 2008, and following Theo Paphitis, James Caan, Deborah Meaden, Peter Jones and Duncan Bannatyne in their own respective programmes. A further episode, focusing on new Dragon Hilary Devey, was broadcast over three years later on 29 December 2011.

The Best of Dragons' Den
The Best of Dragons' Den focuses on presenter Evan Davis taking a look back at the best and worst pitches from the past series of the show, as well as revealing some unseen pitches that were so bad, they didn't make it to broadcast, and talking candidly with the Dragons involved. Two series of the show were produced, the first accompanying series two, with three episodes being broadcast between 19 January and 2 February 2006, and the second accompanying series six, with three episodes being broadcast between 23 February and 9 March 2009.

Dragons' Den: On Tour
Dragons' Den: On Tour was a series of five episodes which aired between 6 September and 7 October 2009. Each episode follows the Dragons (James Caan, Deborah Meaden, Peter Jones, Theo Paphitis and Duncan Bannatyne) as they travel by bus around the United Kingdom to find out what some of the budding entrepreneurs who had appeared on the show have been up to since, including success stories, awful failures, and some very obvious missed opportunities.

Dragons' Den: Online
Dragons' Den: Online was a special, online version of the show, which follows the same format as the main show, but is presented by Dominic Byrne, and features Shaf Rasul and Julie Meyer as the Dragons. Instead of being set inside a Den, entrepreneurs pitch to the two Dragons via online video pitches, and subsequent interaction through webcam chat. The highest amount of money on offer is £50,000, which the Dragons can only individually invest in any one business. Episodes were posted weekly, for six weeks from 16 September 2009 to 7 October 2009, and viewers could participate by rating business plans before the two Dragons offered their verdict.

Other programmes
A number of one-off specials accompanying the broadcast of the main show have also been produced, often as Christmas specials or charity specials. The following eight programmes have been aired thus far:

Pitches to Riches
Dragons' Den: Pitches to Riches reviews some of the more memorable and successful pitches.

Successful people
Some contestants have gone on to reach the market with their products despite being turned down by the dragons and have met with a range of success. Examples include: hungryhouse.co.uk, a website for online ordering of home delivered takeaway food; Destination London, a board game; the Tangle Teezer, a hairbrush designed to smooth knotted hair; Trunki, travel luggage designed for children; and Hornit, a bicycle horn reaching a volume of 140 decibels.

Departures

Simon Woodroffe
After only one series of the programme, Woodroffe left the panel, citing his displeasure with the show's treatment of the entrepreneurs.

Rachel Elnaugh
Shortly before the launch of the second series in 2005, Elnaugh's company Red Letter Days went into administration and its remaining assets were bought by fellow dragons Peter Jones and Theo Paphitis. Although Elnaugh was at the helm before and at the time of the company's failure, she blamed the problems on the actions of the previous CEO whom she appointed in 2002, whilst she took a non-executive role to have her fourth child. Following disputes with other Dragons, and the continuing uncomfortable position of the BBC allowing a perceived "failed" businessperson to continue investing on the show, she agreed to leave the Dragons' Den panel.

Doug Richard
Richard announced his departure from the show in 2005, having failed to make any investments in the second series.

Richard Farleigh
It was announced on 18 May 2007 that Farleigh had been dropped from the series. Farleigh's replacement was the British-Pakistani businessman James Caan.

James Caan
On 7 January 2011, the BBC announced James Caan had quit the Dragons' Den panel. He was replaced by Hilary Devey in February 2011.

Hilary Devey
In June 2012, it was announced that after only two series in the show, Devey would be departing the show to front her own business series for Channel 4. Her final appearance was in the tenth series which aired in Autumn 2012. Devey was replaced by Kelly Hoppen for the 11th series in 2013. Several tributes were paid to Devey following her death in 2022 from the BBC, presenter Evan Davis and fellow dragons.

Theo Paphitis
On 7 February 2013, Paphitis said that he would be leaving Dragons' Den because of other commitments. Paphitis was replaced by Piers Linney from Series 11 onwards. Paphitis however returned during Series 17 for four episodes, stepping in for Touker Suleyman whilst he recovered from a short illness, and again during Series 18 for 3 episodes, stepping in for Peter Jones whilst he self isolated due to the COVID-19 pandemic.

Piers Linney
Linney announced that he would be departing the show at the end of series twelve, in order to focus on various other projects and dedicate more time to his family. He was replaced by Nick Jenkins from series 13 onwards.

Kelly Hoppen
On 23 January 2015, Kelly Hoppen announced her departure from the show after two series, stating she was unable to commit to the filming schedule whilst she focused on other commitments. She was replaced by Sarah Willingham from series 13 onwards.

Duncan Bannatyne
It was announced in July 2014 that, due to "other business commitments", Bannatyne would be departing from the show. His final appearance was in the last episode of series 12, in which he made an investment jointly with Peter Jones in a cash-and-carry business seeking finance for a new sports drink. This left Jones as the only remaining original Dragon. He was replaced by Touker Suleyman from series 13 onwards.

Sarah Willingham
Willingham departed the show on 31 January 2017 after two series, confirming that she had decided to take a year out travelling with her family and was unable to take part in the programme. She was replaced by Jenny Campbell from series 15 onwards.

Nick Jenkins
Jenkins confirmed he was leaving on 31 January 2017 alongside Sarah Willingham, also after two series, saying "I have thoroughly enjoyed making Dragons' Den but I want to focus more on my portfolio of educational technology businesses and that would make it difficult to take on any more investments from the den." He was replaced by Tej Lalvani from series 15 onwards.

Jenny Campbell 
Campbell left Dragons' Den with her last episode airing on 3 February 2019. She put her leaving down to a need to focus on her new role at the Prince's Trust Enterprise Fellowship Programme, as well as helping her sons Rik and Tom develop as entrepreneurs. She was replaced in series 17 by Sara Davies.

Tej Lalvani 
In January 2021, it was announced that Lalvani would be leaving the show after four years, to focus on the expansion and development of his business Vitabiotics. He left at the end of Series 18. In May 2021 it was announced that from Series 19 Lalvani was to be replaced by entrepreneur Steven Bartlett, who at the time, was the youngest dragon in the den's history.

Criticism

Sunday Mirror and The Daily Telegraph investigations 
Although the BBC has never made any secret of deals that succeeded or fell through, usually offering a follow-up in the final episode of the series, investigations conducted in 2006 and 2015 respectively by the Sunday Mirror and The Daily Telegraph newspapers  criticised the show, reporting that many of the deals were unfulfilled after the programmes were shot, alleging half of Dragons' Den investments fall through. The articles claimed that the Dragons either pulled out of the deals over minor technicalities, deliberately offered unfavourable terms to the entrepreneurs in an effort to make them withdraw, or simply broke off all contact with them after the recording. Tiger Mobiles, a company which unsuccessfully applied to appear on the show in 2008, looked in depth at all 143 businesses that won cash on the show between series 1 and 11, alleging just £5.8m of the £13m pledged was ever invested. Dan Forster, who compiled the research for Tiger Mobiles, claimed that the issue was less about the structure of deals and more about the kind of companies that the BBC invites to take part in the show. "The problem lies with the BBC, who, in a bid to keep the viewer count high, have turned the show into a contrived affair that’s more about viewer entertainment than genuine business success. They tend to pick pitchers who are TV-friendly rather than those who are investible with a healthy balance sheet."

The Dragons have defended their record, blaming the failures on the entrepreneurs themselves, claiming they were dishonest in their pitches. Duncan Bannatyne said: "We don't hand over money to people who don't tell the truth." Theo Paphitis concurred: "I kept up my end of the bargain. The show is not about a cash prize, it is about us pledging to invest. But people must tell the truth. Simple." When quizzed about the numbers, Deborah Meaden defended her position informing the Telegraph: "I've had entrepreneurs with extremely unfortunate health issues, patent issues, and two or three silences where I never hear from them again." Meaden also added that "The world explodes for businesses after Dragons’ Den, they get offered better deals in some cases, or think they don't need the Dragons. But what they find when the publicity dies down is that they still need help running the business."

A BBC spokesman responded to the Sunday Mirror in 2006 saying: "After the initial agreement is made on camera, both parties enter a period of due diligence. Sometimes during this period the deals fall through." In 2015, a BBC spokesman commented on Forster's claims, saying: "We are proud of our record of achieving investment offers in the Den and we look into every detail of a business before they are offered a slot on the show. The BBC plays no role in the deal after recording, and we accept that it is typical for some angel investments to fall down at the due diligence stage."

From Series 1 to 11 the Telegraph’s research claimed:

 76 out of the total 143 agreed investments never went through after the den.
 23 of the 143 business that successfully pitched are no longer trading.
 Of the £13 million pledged by the Dragons, only £5.8 million was ever invested.
 £250,000 is the highest amount ever successfully pitched for in the den. However, on the two occasions £250,000 was offered, neither investment went through after the show.

Clarity of investments and treatment of entrepreneurs
The differences between the agreement televised and the deals proposed after filming have caused controversy regarding how entrepreneurs are treated on the show. In 2012, the show faced calls to be cancelled following allegations that many entrepreneurs were being misled to believe their pledge of investment was based on returns from equity when in fact the deals were little different from personal loans.

Founder of The Black Farmer food range Wilfred Emmanuel-Jones, although never appearing in the den himself, has heavily criticised the show, telling The Independent "How many deals in the Den have succeeded in the long run? Not many. And a lot of the deals the Dragons make will be based on loans or are equity-based, which is the worst kind of finance you can get for a start-up, there are hundreds of people out there you can get advice from - do not go to a Dragon. I know what it's like to build a successful business: hard graft gets you there, not appearing on a TV show. People would be much better off speaking to their bank manager. "He also added "The Dragons are interested only in a good deal that benefits them, and their justification in being that ruthless is because a lot of the deals go wrong. Like everyone, I thought the show was quite novel when it first came out, but Dragons' Den is a programme that has had its time."

The BBC has occasionally received backlash in regards to the editing of the pitches, alleging the show favours information concerning the entrepreneur's businesses that the dragon's find desirable or cite as inaccurate, whilst removing their admissions of misunderstandings and acceptance of the entrepreneur's strongholds. The BBC received complaints following a pitch from series 2 contestant Stipan Saulich, owner of 'Super Knees,' a strap for roller skates to ease strain on the knees, where his pitch was shortened to the extent that he did not speak and no feedback displayed as to why the dragons decided not to invest, only featuring a short ridiculing from the dragons following his demonstration of the device. Joe Nelson, who featured in series 11 pitching for investment in his business ‘TheyFit,’ accused the BBC of ‘maliciously’ editing his pitch by featuring what he insists were several inaccuracies from the dragons over the product’s visage and patent but did not feature the dragons allegedly rescinding these comments following his response. Birmingham entrepreneurs Howard Brown and Alex Black, owners of Real Infra Red Ltd, an underfloor heating business, complained that despite achieving £85,000 investment from Touker Suleyman during filming for series 19, they were not featured in any of the episodes. Brown and Black stated that the BBC informed them prior to the end of the series' broadcast that they would not be featured, however did not explain as to why they favoured pitches featuring the dragons declining investment and ridiculing entrepreneurs. Brown also stated their dismay at the loss of marketing exposure.

Talpa Products Ltd allegations
The second episode of series 7 saw entrepreneur Sharon Wright, owner of Talpa Products Ltd, accept a joint offer from James Caan and Duncan Bannatyne at £80,000 for 22.5% after pitching the company's product 'Magnamole.' She has since alleged that Caan and Bannatyne misled her in the den, and that following filming the pledge of £80,000 was in fact a loan and not a purchase of equity. Wright was initially told to meet with series 5 entrepreneurs ElectroExpo, whom Caan and Bannatyne had also invested in together, instead of meeting with the dragons themselves. She was then informed an £80,000 loan would come from them and she would have to pay it back, as opposed to the dragons each giving £40,000 as pledged in the den.

She stated she continued with the process so as not to alarm her existing investors. She was featured in the spin-off series Dragon Den: On Tour where she signed the contract beside Bannatyne, however she later alleged they threatened to withdraw the offer if the contract was not signed and did not have time to get legal representation to review it. Wright said she proceeded as she was then desperate for the money having increased her borrowing to over £26,500 having not seen the full £80,000 pledged, with ElectroExpo only releasing £4,000 to that point. Following the contract being signed she alleged Caan had misled her to believe he would pay for certain services, leading her to receive invoices that she could not afford, and then learnt she would have to pay up to £3,000 for PR services he would then supply. She then appointed a solicitor to review the contract and became aware she had limited access to the £80,000 loan, whilst the dragons had nonetheless purchased the 22.5% equity stake originally agreed upon for just £29. It was also said that at least one of the dragons would become a director, which her solicitor deemed controversial as the equity stake given was generally low. Stating she was now in severe financial difficulty and unable to pay her staff, Wright accused Caan of suggesting she reduce her salary from £50,000 to £12,000 to cope. With Talpa Products now facing financial collapse having subsequently lost part of its supply chain due to the investment's initial lack of clarity, Wright's solicitor terminated the contract and she eventually secured a £100,000 investment from another investor. Despite the product's eventual success, she admitted to suffering a nervous breakdown as a result of the stress endured and was subsequently hospitalised.

Responding to Wright's allegations, Caan stated 'Unfortunately, within a few months of Sharon appearing [on Dragons' Den] she decided that due to the success and positive feedback from the show she would prefer to keep 100% of her company, which Duncan and I fully supported. Occasionally the investment opportunity isn't as it appears on the show. I wish Sharon all the best.' Wright filed a lawsuit against Caan, deeming his response derogatory, but was advised to drop proceedings under legal advice. Although defending the involvement of Electro-Expo, Bannatyne implied that he was disgusted by Caan's alleged £3,000 PR fee charge and stated his regret that he did not invest alone with Wright, insisting he would have solely offered money for equity as stated in the den and not offered a loan.

Dragon departure controversies
Former dragon Simon Woodroffe left the show after participating in the first series citing his distaste for how he felt the entrepreneurs were treated on the show, quoting 'The show became a battle of egos - not a forum for business innovation,' whilst also adding 'The thing to remember was that when you walk up the stairs to pitch, it's not five people necessarily thinking, how am I going to be able to make an investment here? They're also thinking, am I going to be the star of this next little piece? That's not how I was told the show would go down.'

Richard Farleigh's departure from the series was met with controversy following the announcement that British-Pakistani businessman James Caan would be his replacement, leading to suggestions that the BBC had not invited him back in favour of having a new dragon from an ethnic minority. Farleigh announced his disappointment at being dropped from the series stating, "It would be disappointing if that was the reason - rather than anything fundamental - if it was because I was the wrong colour. I don't know why this has happened and I am very disappointed and bemused - I wasn't expecting it because all the feedback I got was very positive. I had even moved back to the UK to focus on commitments for the show. I am gutted that I have not been invited back." A BBC spokeswoman said "Richard will remain very much a part of the Dragons' Den team and will appear in related shows such when we catch up on some of the investments, It is a perfectly normal transition for the series. We do not discuss the reasons for the decision but it is all very amicable."

In 2010, Duncan Bannatyne claimed Pakistani-born Caan had an 'unfair' business advantage due to his non-domiciled tax status. He complained that because Caan does not pay UK tax on his overseas earnings he has more money to invest in his UK ventures. Caan told the London Evening Standard: "I do not apologise for my country of origin, Pakistan." He also said he could not invest with anyone who had a criminal record – a reference to Bannatyne having served a sentence in military prison when he was a teenager in the Royal Navy. Bannatyne replied that Caan was 'playing the race card' and 'personalising the whole thing', and accused him of implying he was racist. Only days before the filming of series 8, Bannatyne pointed out on Twitter that Caan is chairman of the Big Issue, which employs sellers with criminal pasts, and asking how they could now work with their chief. He brought the name of the Big Issue founder into the row by asking: 'Did John Bird know about James Caan's view on ex-prisoners when he gave him the chairman's role?' Caan later faced bad press when he was reported to have offered to buy a baby from a family affected by the 2010 Pakistan flood. Caan subsequently decided to leave the show in January 2011. The BBC announced regret and sorrow over the exit and thanked him for his efforts over his four series in the show. Clive Morgan of The Daily Telegraph criticised his departure, stating his exit was the show's loss and it would not be the same without him.

References

External links
 
 
 
 

2005 British television series debuts
2000s British reality television series
2010s British reality television series
2020s British reality television series
BBC high definition shows
BBC Television shows
BBC reality television shows
Business-related television series in the United Kingdom
British television series based on Japanese television series
English-language television shows
Television series by BBC Studios
Television series by Sony Pictures Television
Television productions suspended due to the COVID-19 pandemic
Business mass media in the United Kingdom